Pir Syed Mustafa Sibghatullah Shah Irani (1900–1986), popularly known as Pir Irani, was a Sufi saint who was the Khalifa of Baba Ji Khawaja Muhammad Qasim of Mohra Sharif. He was taught by Baba Ji Khawaja Muhammad Qasim Sadiq of Mohra Sharif. His father named him Sibghatullah, and his mother liked the name Mustafa. He got the Title "Pir Irani" from his  Murshid Baba Ji Khawaja Muhammad Qasim Sadiq of Mohra Sharif. He was born in Iran and belonged to an influential Syed family. His ancestors were associated with Shahanshah Iran dynasty from centuries. After getting basic education, he graduated from the military academy. Reza Shah Pahlavi called him and assigned the job of Assistant to General Auditor. After the war of Ispahan, he became close aide of Reza Shah Pahlavi. His interest in Islam compelled him to look for a guide Murshid or Pir. He got his initial training Sulook from Aaka Shams-ul-Urafa at Tehran, Iran. After one year of his spiritual education Sulook, his master Murshid directed him "Pir Irani" to seek further spiritual education from Hindustan "India". He started his journey towards Hindustan; while traveling, he met with Khizer Al-Khidr who guided him towards Baba Ji Khawaja Muhammad Qasim Sadiq. He got his spiritual Education from 1930 until 1938 at Mohra Sharif. He got khilafat or Ijaza in Sufi orders especially named four Sufi orders i.e. Naqshbandi, Suhrawardiyya, Chishti Order, Qadiriyyah. He was then sent to Sindh, Pakistan to preach others.

Pir Irani remained at Hyderabad and guided thousands of disciples,  He died on 27 December 1986 at Hyderabad and rested at mustafaiya shareef.

External links
Khalifa of Baba ji 
Qasimiya Order
Naqshbandia Owaisiah Order of Sufism

Pakistani Sufi saints
Sufi mystics
1900 births
1986 deaths
Iranian Sufi saints